Janaki Janmasthali Mandir is a proposed grand temple of princess Sita in Mithila at her birthplace. The site is located at the Punaura Dham in Sitamarhi district of Bihar in India. The site is considered as the appearance place from where Sita was found closed in a box from a farm field while the  King Janaka was ploughing the farm field. Ramayana Research Council has proposed the construction of the world's tallest 251-feet statue of Mother Sita at Sitamarhi. The foundation stone of the Janaki Janmasthali Mandir will be laid in February at Punauradham in Sitamarhi, the place of manifestation of Goddess Janaki.

Description 
The grand Janaki Janmasthali Mandir will be constructed at Sitakund of Punauradham in Sitamarhi. The construction of this temple will be done by the Mahavir Mandir Trust of Patna. The temple has been designed by architect Piyush Sompura. The permission of construction of the proposed temple has been received from the Bihar State Religious Trust Board. Excellent Makrana stone will be used in the construction of the proposed divine temple.

References 

Mithila
Sita temples
Hindu temples
Ramayana
Hinduism by location
Sitamarhi district
Hindu temples by deity